Alberndorf im Pulkautal is a town in the district of Hollabrunn in Lower Austria, Austria.

Population

Twin towns
Alberndorf is twinned with Hainburg, Germany.

Politics
Mayor of the town is Christian Hartmann from the Austrian People's Party (ÖVP). Chief Officer is Marion Koran.
The town council, consisting of 15 seats, is distributed to following parties after the election 2020: ÖVP 7, HLA 5, SPÖ 1, FPÖ 2.

References

Cities and towns in Hollabrunn District